Listie is an unincorporated community in Somerset County, Pennsylvania, United States. Listie had a post office until September 28, 2002; it still has its own ZIP code, 15549.

References

Unincorporated communities in Somerset County, Pennsylvania
Unincorporated communities in Pennsylvania